Giovanna "Vannozza" (dei) Cattanei (13 July 1442 – 24 November 1518) was an Italian woman who was the chief mistress of Cardinal Rodrigo de Borgia, later to become Pope Alexander VI.

Early life
Born in 1442, most likely in Mantua, Vannozza moved to Rome where she was landlady of several inns (Osterie), at first in the Borgo, then in Campo de' Fiori. Before becoming Borgia's mistress, she allegedly had a relationship with Cardinal Giuliano della Rovere, the future Pope Julius II.

Relationship with Rodrigo de Borgia
Vannozza's relationship with Cardinal Rodrigo de Borgia began sometime between 1466 and 1472. She is believed to have married Domenico d'Arignano, an officer of the Church, perhaps in 1473, possibly at the arrangement of Borgia.

She bore four children whom Borgia openly acknowledged as his:
 Cesare (1475–1507)
 Giovanni (1476–1497), 2nd Duke of Gandia 
 Lucrezia (1480–1519)
 Goffredo (born 1481 or 1482; died 1518)

Domenico died before Giovanni was born. In 1480 Borgia arranged Vannozza's marriage to Giorgio di Croce, for whom he had procured a position as apostolic secretary. During the marriage to Giorgio, Vannozza had a son, Ottavio or Ottaviano di Croce, who did not live long. In 1486 Giorgio died and Vannozza married Carlo Canale.

Later life
After his elevation to the papacy, Borgia's passion for Vannozza somewhat diminished, and she subsequently led a very retired life.  However, Borgia's love for his children by Vannozza remained as strong as ever; it proved, indeed, the determining factor of his whole career. He lavished vast sums on them and lauded them with every honour. She, too, remained the matriarch of the Borgia family and influential during the papacy of Rodrigo Borgia.

Vannozza died in 1518 and was buried in the Basilica of Santa Maria del Popolo in Rome.

Arnold Mathew wrote: "Vannozza breathed her last at Rome, November 26, 1518, at the age of seventy-six. She was buried with conspicuous honours 'almost like a Cardinal' in the Church of Santa Maria del Popolo, near her son, the Duke of Gandia. An official character was imparted to the ceremony by the presence of the papal Court. Pope Leo X in this way recognised Vannozza either as the widow of Alexander VI or as the mother of the Duchess of Ferrara."

In fiction
In the 2006 film The Conclave, she is played by Nora Tschirner. In Showtime's 2011 series The Borgias, she is played by Joanne Whalley. In Borgia, the Canal+ production of the same year created by Tom Fontana, she is played by Assumpta Serna.

Notes

References

Sources

Los Borgia, Juan Antonio Cebrián, Temas de Hoy, 2006. 

1442 births
1518 deaths
Nobility of Mantua
16th-century Italian nobility
Papal mistresses
15th-century Italian women
15th-century Italian nobility
Pope Alexander VI